The Subterraneans is a 1960 American drama film directed by Ranald MacDougall based on the 1958 novel of the same name by Jack Kerouac.

Plot
Leo is a 28-year-old novelist who still lives at home with his mother. One night he stumbles upon some beatniks at a coffee house. He falls in love with the beautiful but unstable Mardou Fox.

Roxanne warns Mardou away from Leo, who says his love for her is causing him writer's block. Mardou falls pregnant. She and Leo wind up together.

Cast
Leslie Caron as Mardou Fox
George Peppard as Leo Percepied
Janice Rule as Roxanne
Roddy McDowall as Yuri Gligoric
Anne Seymour as Charlotte Percepied
Jim Hutton as Adam Moorad
Scott Marlowe as Julien Alexander
Arte Johnson as Arial Lavalerra
Ruth Storey as Analyst
Bert Freed as Bartender
Gerry Mulligan as Reverend Joshua Hoskins
Carmen McRae as herself

Production
The novel was optioned by Arthur Freed of MGM as a possible follow up to Some Came Running. Like that film, it was originally intended to star Dean Martin. Nicole Maurey was announced to play the female lead.

Eventually George Peppard and Leslie Caron were signed. Roddy McDowall also joined the cast, his first film in nine years. Janice Rule was then married to Robert Thom, who wrote the script.

This adaptation changed the African American character Mardou Fox, Kerouac's love interest, to a young French girl (played by Leslie Caron) to better pacify racists. While it was derided and vehemently criticized by Allen Ginsberg, among others, for its two-dimensional characters, it is an example of the way Hollywood attempted to exploit the emerging popularity of Beat culture as it grew in San Francisco and Greenwich Village, New York, without really understanding it.

A Greenwich Village beatnik bar setting had been used for scenes in Richard Quine's film Bell, Book and Candle (1958), but Ranald MacDougall's adaptation of Kerouac's novel, scripted by Robert Thom, was less successful.

The Subterraneans was one of the final MGM films produced by Arthur Freed, and features a score by André Previn and brief appearances by jazz singer Carmen McRae singing "Coffee Time," and saxophonists Gerry Mulligan, as a street priest, and Art Pepper. Comedian Arte Johnson plays the Gore Vidal character, here named Arial Lavalerra.

Box-office
According to MGM records, the film earned only $340,000 in the US and Canada and $425,000 elsewhere resulting in a loss of $1,311,000.

Musical score and soundtrack

The film score was composed, arranged and conducted by André Previn, with the motion picture also featuring Previn's jazz trio. The soundtrack album was released on the MGM label in 1960.

AllMusic's Jason Ankeny observed: "André Previn had the good sense to recruit cool jazz giants including Gerry Mulligan, Russ Freeman, and Dave Bailey to perform his Subterraneans score: jazz not only fueled Kerouac's work, but his prose sought to evoke the rhythms and energy of bebop. Indeed, this music comes far closer to accurately capturing Kerouac's writing than any of the film's dialogue. Previn also deserves credit for articulating the sadness of the original novel, deftly combining horns and strings to create a score that is dark and emotive".

Track listing
All compositions by André Previn except as indicated
 "Why Are We Afraid" (Previn, Dory Langdon) – 1:57
 "Guido's Blackhawk" – 3:05
 "Two by Two" – 4:00
 "Bread and Wine" – 4:12
 "Coffee Time" (Harry Warren, Arthur Freed) – 2:43
 "A Rose and the End" – 3:24
 "Should I" (Nacio Herb Brown, Freed) – 2:28
 "Look Ma, No Clothes" – 1:32
 "Things are Looking Down" – 5:39
 "Analyst" – 4:19
 "Like Blue" – 1:58
 "Raising Caen" – 3:02

Personnel
André Previn – piano, arranger, conductor
Gerry Mulligan – baritone saxophone (tracks 1, 3, 4, 6 and 8–10)
Carmen McRae – vocals (track 5)
Art Farmer (tracks 4 & 9), Jack Sheldon (1, 3, 6, 8 & 10 and 12) – trumpet
Bob Enevoldsen – valve trombone (tracks 1, 3, 4, 6 and 9)
Art Pepper – alto saxophone (tracks 1, 3, 4, 6 & 8–10 and 12)
Bill Perkins – tenor saxophone (tracks 1, 3, 4, 6 and 9)
Russ Freeman – piano (tracks 4, 9 and 12)
Buddy Clark (tracks 4 & 9), Red Mitchell (tracks 1–3, 5–8, and 10–12) – bass 
Dave Bailey (tracks 4 & 9), Shelly Manne (tracks 1–3, 5–8, and 10–12) – drums
Unidentified string section, clarinet and oboe (tracks 1, 3, 6, 8 and 10)

See also
 List of American films of 1960

References

1958.  The Subterraneans,

Further reading
 O'Sullivan, S., 'Alene Lee: Subterranean Muse', in Wills, D. (ed.) Beatdom Vol. 4 (Mauling Press: Dundee, 2009) p. 20

External links

The Subterraneans at TCMDB

1960 films
1960 drama films
American drama films
Films about writers
Films based on American novels
Films based on novels
Films about the Beat Generation
Films directed by Ranald MacDougall
Films scored by André Previn
Films set in 1953
Films set in San Francisco
Films shot in San Francisco
Metro-Goldwyn-Mayer films
Underground culture
1960s English-language films
1960s American films